Karko may be:

Karko language (India)
Karko language (Sudan)